Harvey Grant (born July 4, 1965) is an American former professional National Basketball Association basketball player. He is the identical twin brother of Horace Grant, also a former NBA player.

College
Grant transferred to Oklahoma after a year at Independence Community College and a year at Clemson with his brother Horace. He was a member of the 1988 Sooner team that went to the National Championship and lost to Kansas.

Career

Washington Bullets (1988–1993) 
Selected twelfth overall by the Washington Bullets in the 1988 NBA draft out of Oklahoma, Grant averaged 5.6 points, 2.3 rebounds and 1.1 assists per game. He lifted his averages to 8.2 points, 4.2 rebounds and 1.6 assists the following season, in 1989–90. Grant improved markedly in the 1990–91 campaign, when he averaged 18.2 points, 7.2 rebounds, 2.6 assists and 1.18 steals per game. At season's end, he was runner-up to the 1991 NBA Most Improved Player Award (which was earned by Orlando's Scott Skiles). In two subsequent seasons, he continued his solid play with 18.0 and 18.6 points per contest in 1991–92 and 1992–93, respectively.

Portland Trail Blazers (1993–1996) 
In 1993, Grant was traded to the Portland Trail Blazers in exchange for center Kevin Duckworth, where he was instead utilized in a secondary role off the bench, and in three seasons with Portland, averaged 9.6 points per game.

Return to Washington (1996–1998) 
On July 15, 1996, Grant returned to the Washington Bullets via a trade, along with Blazers point guard Rod Strickland, for power forward Rasheed Wallace and shooting guard Mitchell Butler. By this stage Grant's career was on a downslide, averaging 4.1 points in 1996–97, then slipping to 2.6 points the following season when the Bullets franchise had reinvented itself as the Wizards.

Philadelphia 76ers (1999) 
Grant rounded out his professional career with the Philadelphia 76ers in the lockout-shortened 1999 NBA season, averaging 3.1 points and 2.3 rebounds in 47 of 50 possible games.

Grant was traded just before the 1999–00 season along with Anthony Parker to the Orlando Magic for Billy Owens, who had previously been sent to the Magic in a trade that sent brother Horace to the Seattle SuperSonics. He subsequently was waived by the team and retired from the league afterwards.

Never proficient as a rebounder in comparison with his brother, he holds career averages of 4.4 rebounds and 9.9 points per game.

Personal life
Grant's son Jerai, who played college basketball for Clemson University, the same school that Harvey attended before transferring to Oklahoma, has since played in professional leagues in Australia, Italy, Israel, Latvia and currently Lithuania. Another son, Jerian, played for the University of Notre Dame and was selected by the New York Knicks in the 1st round of the 2015 NBA Draft, and a younger son, Jerami, played for the Syracuse University before being drafted 39th overall by the Philadelphia 76ers in the 2014 NBA draft. Jerami was traded to the Oklahoma City Thunder on November 1, 2016, and played three seasons in Oklahoma City before being traded to the Denver Nuggets on July 8, 2019. Jaelin Grant is his youngest son. Harvey Grant also has a daughter, Mikayla, born in 2005 with ex-girlfriend Karen Mitchell. Harvey currently resides in Annapolis, MD and is married to Tonya Dean Steiner Grant. 

Grant is also a grandfather to Jerai's daughter, Halle.

References

External links
 

1965 births
Living people
African-American basketball players
All-American college men's basketball players
American men's basketball coaches
American men's basketball players
Basketball coaches from Georgia (U.S. state)
Basketball players from Augusta, Georgia
Clemson Tigers men's basketball players
Hampton Pirates men's basketball coaches
Identical twins
Independence Pirates men's basketball players
Oklahoma Sooners men's basketball players
Philadelphia 76ers players
Portland Trail Blazers players
Power forwards (basketball)
Small forwards
American twins
Twin sportspeople
Washington Bullets draft picks
Washington Bullets players
Washington Wizards players
United States Basketball League coaches
21st-century African-American people
20th-century African-American sportspeople